Jaylon Moore (born January 9, 1998) is an American football offensive tackle for the San Francisco 49ers of the National Football League (NFL). He was selected with the 155th pick of the 2021 NFL Draft. He played college football at Western Michigan.

College career

Moore was ranked as a twostar recruit by 247Sports.com coming out of high school. He committed to Western Michigan on June 7, 2015. He was a tight end in high school, but converted to offensive lineman in college.

Professional career

Moore was drafted by the San Francisco 49ers with the 155th pick in the fourth round of the 2021 NFL Draft. He signed his four-year rookie contract on May 13, 2021.

References

External links
Western Michigan bio

1998 births
Living people
San Francisco 49ers players
Western Michigan Broncos football players
American football offensive linemen
Players of American football from Detroit